A Game at Chess is a comic satirical play by Thomas Middleton, first staged in August 1624 by the King's Men at the Globe Theatre. The play is notable for its political content, dramatizing a conflict between Spain and England.

The plot takes the form of a chess match, and the play includes some genuine chess moves. Instead of personal names, the characters are known as the White Knight, the Black King, and so forth. Yet the play unmistakably alludes to Anglo-Spanish diplomacy under King James, especially the failed marriage negotiation between Prince Charles and the Spanish Infanta Maria Anna of Spain. The play is satirical of King James I of England, and it was shut down after only nine days.

Historical context
A Game at Chess satirises historical events and figures of the early seventeenth century. Those depicted include members of the English court, the Spanish court, and prominent religious figures. James I, who reigned as King of England and Ireland from 1603 until his death in 1625, is depicted as the White King by Middleton. His son and successor, Prince Charles or Charles I, reigned after the play was written and is depicted as the White Knight. Elizabeth of Bohemia, James I's daughter, is also represented in the play as the White Queen. From Spain, Middleton depicts Philip IV, who reigned as King from 1621 to 1665, as the Black King. His sister Maria Anna of Spain is represented by the Black Queen. Don Diego Sarmiento de Acuña, Conde de Gondomar, the Spanish ambassador who was deeply unpopular in England, is depicted as the Black Knight. Religious figures depicted include Archbishop of Split, Marco Antonio de Dominis, or the Fat Bishop, who left the Roman Catholic Church to join the Anglican Church, later returning to Rome.

The play takes place at a time of heightened tension between England and Spain, and it alludes to negotiations between the two countries to wed Prince Charles to the Spanish Infanta Maria Anna. The royal families hoped that the Spanish match would at the very least resolve some of the conflicts between England and Spain that still lingered after the Thirty Years' War. Additionally, James I hoped that a marriage alliance would restore his daughter Elizabeth to the Bohemian throne. Protestant English citizens were antagonistic toward the prospect of a marriage between their prince and the Catholic Infanta. Many feared for the safety of Prince Charles and the Duke of Buckingham when they travelled to Spain in February 1623 for the negotiations, and some feared that Charles would convert to Catholicism. Charles and Buckingham, who travelled in disguise, were unprepared to negotiate effectively with the Spanish, and they agreed to Spanish terms in order to return to England unharmed. The marriage did not go ahead, and the English public largely saw Charles's safe return and the failure of the negotiations as a victory against Spanish Catholics.

The play was stopped after nine performances (6–16 August, Sundays omitted), but not before it had become "the greatest box-office hit of early modern London". The Privy Council opened a prosecution against the actors and the author of the play on 18 August, on the grounds that it was then illegal to portray any modern Christian king onstage. The Globe Theatre was shut down by the prosecution, though Middleton was able to acquit himself by showing that the play had been approved by the Master of the Revels, Sir Henry Herbert. After James I's death, the play was printed in multiple editions, but Middleton never wrote another full play.

Characters

Opening sequence
Prologue
Ignatius Loyola — Ghost of the founder of the Jesuits
Error — An allegorical personification of religious heresy

White House
White King — Alludes to King James I of England. Protestant leader of the White House. 
White King's Pawn — A spy for the Black House, most often identified as alluding to Lionel Cranfield, Earl of Middlesex.
White Queen — Alludes to Elizabeth of Bohemia, daughter of King James
White Queen's Pawn — A young virgin, former fiancée of the White Bishop's Pawn.
White Knight — Alludes to Prince Charles, son of King James
White Duke — Alludes to George Villiers, 1st Duke of Buckingham, favourite of King James and companion of Prince Charles
Fat Bishop — Alludes to Marc Antonio de Dominis, Bishop of Spalato, a former bishop of the Black House who has recanted to join the White House. A comic role, written for the actor William Rowley.
Fat Bishop's Pawn — A servant.
White Bishop — Alludes to the Archbishop of Canterbury.
White Bishop's Pawn — A Protestant minister, former fiancée of the White Queen's Pawn who has been castrated by the Black Knights's Pawn
White Pawn — A servant pawn of unspecified allegiance.

Black House
Black King — Alludes to King Philip IV of Spain. Catholic Leader of the Black House. 
Black Queen — Alludes to Maria Anna of Spain, proposed bride of the White Knight
Black Queen's Pawn — A Jesuitess.
Black Knight — Alludes to Diego Sarmiento de Acuña, conde de Gondomar, who was the Spanish ambassador to London.
Black Knight's Pawn — A suitor of the White Queen's Pawn and castrator of the White Bishop's Pawn.
Black Duke — Alludes to Gaspar de Guzmán, Count-Duke of Olivares, a favourite of Philip IV
Black Bishop — Alludes to the Father-General of the Jesuits.
Black Bishop's Pawn — A Jesuit.
Black Jesting Pawn — A comic pawn of unspecified allegiance who teases a White Pawn. Does not appear in all versions of the play.
Black Pawn — A servant pawn of unspecified allegiance.

Synopsis

Prologue and Induction 
The Prologue explains that the forthcoming stage play will be based on a game of chess, with some chess pieces representing men and states.

The Ghost of Ignatius Loyola (founder of the Jesuit Order) expresses surprise at finding a rare corner of the world where his order has not been established. His servant, Error, wakes up and says that he had been dreaming of a game of chess where "our side"—the Black House/Catholics—was set against the White House/Protestants. Ignatius says that he wants to see the dream, so he can observe his side's progress. The actors, as chess pieces, enter. Ignatius expresses contempt for his own followers and says that his true aim is to rule the entire world by himself.

Act I

The Jesuitess Black Queen's Pawn attempts to corrupt the Virgin White Queen's Pawn. Faking tears, she says she pities the White Virgin Queen's Pawn, who she says will be "lost eternally," despite her beauty, because she is too loyal. The Jesuit Black Bishop's Pawn enters, attempting to corrupt the Virgin White Queen's Pawn. He encourages her to confess her sins to him. The Virgin White Queen's Pawn confesses that she considered entering into a  relationship with the White Bishop's Pawn, but he was castrated by the Black Knight's Pawn. The Black Bishop's Pawn gives her a manual on moral instruction, and she exits.

The Black Knight's Pawn and his castrated victim, the White Bishop's Pawn, exchange insults. The Black Knight Gondomar enters and notes that the "business of the universal monarchy" (i.e. the business of the Catholic Church) is going well, primarily because of his ability to trap souls through charm and deception. The White King's Pawn—a spy employed by the Black House—enters and issues a report. The Black Knight Gondomar calls the spy a fool after he leaves.

Act II

Virgin White Queen's Pawn enters reading the manual given to her by the Jesuit Black Bishop's Pawn. As she reads to herself, the Jesuit Black Bishop's Pawn enters and finds a letter addressed to him from the Black King. The Black King thanks the Jesuit for his work in corrupting the Virgin White Queen's Pawn, but states his intention to sleep with the Virgin White Queen's Pawn himself. The Jesuit Black Bishop's Pawn says he will help the King, but only after he seduces her first.

The Virgin White Queen's Pawn greets the Jesuit Black Bishop's Pawn and begs him to give her an order to prove her virtue through obedience. He commands her to kiss him. When she refuses, he says her punishment is offering him her virginity. A noise from offstage provides a distraction, and the Virgin White Queen's Pawn escapes.

Soon after, the Jesuits Black Queen's Pawn re-enters and confronts the Jesuit Black Bishop's Pawn about allowing the Virgin White Queen's Pawn to get away. Then, the Jesuit Black Bishop enters with the Black Knight Gondomar. The Black Bishop scolds his pawn, claiming that news of the fumbled seduction will cause scandal for the Black House. The Black Knight Gondomar makes plans for a coverup. He orders the Jesuit Black Bishop's Pawn to flee and says he will falsify documents that make it look as though the pawn was not there when the incident took place. After the pawn flees through a trapdoor, the Black Knight Gondomar orders the burning of all of the pawn's files. The files contained records of various seductions and misdeeds that would implicate the Black House if discovered. Later, the Black Knight's Pawn Gelder enters and expresses remorse for castrating the White Bishop's Pawn.

The Fat Bishop of Spalato, a traitor from the Black House and author of many books criticising the Black House, enters gloating about his life. Next, the Black Knight Gondomar and the Jesuit Black Bishop enter. They curse the Fat Bishop of Spalato and swear vengeance.

The Virgin White Queen's Pawn tells the White King James that the Jesuit Black Bishop's Pawn tried to rape her. The Black Knight Gondomar calls her a liar and produces falsified documents. The White King James finds the virgin guilty of slander. He rules that the Black House may discipline her as they see fit. The Black House decree that the White Virgin must fast for four days and kneel for twelve hours a day in a room filled with erotic images.

Act III

The Fat Bishop expresses dissatisfaction with the White House; he wants more titles and honours.

The Black Knight gives the Fat Bishop a (fake) letter from Rome. The letter suggests that the Fat Bishop could become the next Pope if he switches back to the Black House side. Excited by the letter, the Fat Bishop decides to burn all of the books he has written against the Black House, write a few books against the Whites, and rejoin the Blacks immediately.

The Black Knight's Pawn enters and tells Gondomar that his plot has been foiled: upon investigation, the White Bishop's Pawn discovers that the Black Bishop's Pawn was, indeed, in town when the attempted rape of the Virgin White Queen's Pawn took place. She is acquitted and released.

Angling to regain trust, the Black Queen's Pawn praises the White Virgin's virtue and claims responsibility for creating the distraction that enabled her escape during the attempted rape. The White Virgin is grateful.

The Black Knight reveals that the White King's Pawn is a spy and "captures" him.

The Fat Bishop switches to the Black side and says he will immediately begin writing books against the Whites. In an aside, the Black Knight says he will flatter the Fat Bishop for a while and betray him as soon as he outlives his usefulness.

The (recently captured) White King's Pawn asks the Black Knight how he will be rewarded for his service. Gondomar answers by sending him to "the bag" (a giant onstage bag for captured chess pieces, symbolic of Hell).

The Black Queen's Pawn tells the White Virgin that she has seen the White Virgin's future husband in a magic Egyptian mirror. The White Virgin is intrigued.

The Black Queen's Pawn takes the White Virgin to a room where the magic Egyptian mirror is kept. The Black Bishop's Pawn enters, disguised as the White Virgin's rich future husband (the scene is arranged so that the White Virgin is only able to see the Black Bishop's Pawn in the mirror). The White Virgin is fooled by the ruse.

Act IV

The Black Knight's Pawn still feels guilty for castrating the White Bishop's Pawn, so he asks the Black Bishop's Pawn for absolution. The Black Bishop's Pawn says absolution is impossible.

The Black Queen's Pawn enters with the White Virgin. They notice the Black Bishop's Pawn, who is still disguised as the White Virgin's rich future husband, so the Black Queen's Pawn takes the Black Bishop's Pawn offstage to the magic mirror to see if it is a match. When they return, the Black Bishop's Pawn swears he saw an image of the White Virgin when he looked in the mirror and suggests that they have sex that very night. The White Virgin protests that she cannot have sex until she is married. The Black Bishop's Pawn is distraught, but the Black Queen's Pawn tells him not to worry—she will manage everything.

The Black Knight's Pawn continues to feel remorseful. The Fat Bishop declares that the Pawn cannot be forgiven because there is no payable fine associated with the crime. This distresses the Black Knight's Pawn, so the Fat Bishop suggests that the only course of action is for the Black Knight's Pawn to kill the White Bishop's Pawn so that he would be guilty of murder, which is a forgivable crime in the Fat Bishop's book. The Black Knight's Pawn sets out to kill the White Bishop's Pawn.

The Black Queen's Pawn orchestrates a "bed trick"; she tricks the Black Bishop's Pawn into having sex with her by leading him to believe that he is going to bed with the White Virgin.

The White Knight and the White Duke travel to the Black House for negotiations. The Black Knight Gondomar tells the White Knight Charles that he will do anything to please him. The Fat Bishop attempts to capture the unprotected White Queen, but his attack is prevented by the White Bishop and the White King, who capture the Fat Bishop and send him to "the bag".

Act V

The White Knight and the White Duke enter the Black court, which is decorated with statues and candles. The Black Bishop's Pawn—no longer in his "rich future husband" disguise—tells the White Virgin that he is the man with whom she has spent the night. The White Virgin insists that she spent the night alone. The Black Queen's Pawn enters and reveals her bed trick: that he is the man with whom she has spent the night. White Virgin's virginity is still intact. The White Bishop's Pawn and the White Queen capture the Black Bishop's Pawn and the Jesuitess Black Queen's Pawn and send them to the bag.

The Black Knight's Pawn tries to murder the White Bishop's Pawn, but his attempt is foiled by the White Virgin, who captures him and sends him to the bag. The White Knight and the White Duke have just finished a decadent meal at the Black court. The Black Knight delivers a long speech boasting about the extravagance of the meal. The White Knight says that the meal has not fully satisfied him and that there are two things that he truly hungers for. The Black Knight says he will provide anything Charles desires if he agrees to switch to the Black House. Charles says the two things he desires are ambition and sex. The Black Knight makes two speeches boasting about the Black House's sexual licentiousness and ambition to rule the world. As soon as these crimes have been admitted, the White Knight reveals that he has only been stringing the Black Knight along in order draw him out. Thus, the game is won. The White King appears with the rest of the White House court; all of the remaining Black House pieces are sent to the bag.

Texts
A Game at Chess survives in nine different texts, each of which has its own unique characteristics. Gary Taylor thus calls the play "the most complicated editorial problem in the entire corpus of early modern drama, and one of the most complicated in English literature". The play is unique in that it exists in more 17th-century manuscripts than it does printed editions (six extant manuscripts compared to three printed editions). Of the manuscripts, one is an authorial holograph, and three are the work of Ralph Crane, a professional scribe who worked for the King's Men in this era and who is thought to have prepared some of the play texts for the First Folio of Shakespeare's plays.

The manuscript and printed forms of the text present significant orthographical differences as well as some differences in the plot and characters names. For example, early manuscript forms of the play lack the Prologue and use ambiguous speech prefixes, referring to characters by the initials of their chess pieces rather than by name.

There are two major studies of the relationship between the texts: that of T. H. Howard Hill (1995), and Gary Taylor (2007); the studies give different names to the texts.

Criticism and interpretation

Politics and religion 
Much of the criticism and interpretation of A Game at Chess has focused on its political, religious and allegorical content. Scholars agree that Middleton antagonizes Spanish Catholics and the Jesuit order by portraying them as schemers intent on the domination of the world. The Black Queen's Pawn serves as an example, representing a domestic threat to English women, especially virgins. Overall, Middleton uses black and white imagery to portray Spanish Catholics as evil ("black") in their ambitions to convert the pure English nation ("white") to Catholicism.

Thomas Cogswell has argued that the play enjoyed success not only because of its humorous and critical portrayal of Spain, but also because it celebrates the Duke of Buckingham and Prince Charles as heroes. Cogswell argues that Middleton does not advance the agenda of his patron, the Earl of Pembroke, by criticizing Buckingham. Instead, the play was an attempt to reinforce public support for Charles and Buckingham.

Howard Hill has suggested that the play is not a result of any specific statecraft, but merely takes advantage of the anti-Spanish and anti-Catholic sentiments of the time. However, other scholars see the play as participating in the agenda of Parliamentary Puritans and their Continental counterparts, mainly the Dutch, to galvanize the masses against the Spanish-Catholic hegemony. Gary Taylor has argued that the play was subversive insofar as Middleton's Puritan ideology was in opposition to the Church of England and also the political establishment, specifically King James I of England. For Taylor, the play was meant to be a pointed critique of Catholic ideals and its authoritative control over its subjects’ lives. Yet Taylor also argues that the text "depends upon what it rejects," that is, "obedience, confession, dissembling, totalizing power, and sexual mismatching."

Chess allegory 
Roussel Sargent has argued that Middleton uses chess allegory to elude censorship, allowing him to avoid explicitly identifying his characters with political figures. Portraying the events of the play as a chess match affords Middleton flexibility: he can create completely fictitious characters, and he can also base characters upon political figures. Chess is also a means of portraying the conflicts between Catholic Spain and Protestant England in terms of two clearly opposing sides.

Scholars have observed the racism of Middleton's chess allegory, in which the difference between England and Spain in cast in terms of skin color. The blackness of the Spanish side associates darker complexion with evil, while the whiteness of England associates lighter complexion with purity.

Influence on the public 
Musa Gurnis has observed that scholars have neglected to observe the impact of the play's dramaturgy upon audiences. Gurnis argues that the play not only arouses anti-Catholic sentiment, but also encourages the audience to actively persecute Catholic minorities outside of the theatre. Stephen Wittek notes that plays including A Game at Chess shaped and contributed to the making of a public sphere, as audience members were able to bond over shared experiences and partake in a shared discourse.

References

Bibliography

 Aaron, Melissa. (2003). Global Economics: A History of the Theatre Business, the Chamberlain's/King's Men, and Their Plays, 1599–1642. University of Delaware Press.
 Beneš, Jakub S. (8 December 2016), "Narrating Socialism in Habsburg Austria", Workers and Nationalism, Oxford University Press, retrieved 26 April 2019.
 Bicks, Caroline (2009). "Staging the Jesuitess in 'A Game at Chess'". Studies in English Literature, 1500–1900. 49 (2) – via JSTOR.
 Cogswell, Thomas (1984). Thomas Middleton and the Court, 1624: "A Game at Chess in Context". Huntington Library Quarterly. 47 (4).  – via JSTOR.
 Dutton, Richard (2004). Milling, Jane; Thomson, Peter (eds.). "Thomas Middleton's A Game at Chess : a case study". The Cambridge History of British Theatre. Cambridge: Cambridge University Press. .
 Gurnis, Musa (2018). Mixed Faith and Shared Feeling: Theater in Post-Reformation London. Philadelphia, Pennsylvania. . .
Heinemann, Margot (March 1975)."Middleton's A Game at Chess: Parliamentary‐Puritans and Opposition Drama". English Literary Renaissance. 5 (2). . .
 Howard-Hill, T. H. (1991). "Political Interpretations of Middleton's 'A Game at Chess' (1624)". The Yearbook of English Studies. 21. . .

 Keenan, Siobhan (2014). "Acting Companies and Their Plays in Shakespeare's London". London: Arden.
 Middleton, Thomas (1966). Harper, J.W. (ed.). A Game at Chess. London: Ernest Behn Ltd.
 Middleton, Thomas (2007). Taylor, Gary; Lavagnino, John (eds.). Thomas Middleton : the collected works. Oxford: Clarendon Press. . .
 "Middleton, Thomas (1570?–1627)". Oxford Dictionary of National Biography. Oxford University Press. Retrieved 22 April 2019.
 Redworth, Glyn. (2003). The Prince and the Infanta: The Cultural Politics of the Spanish Match. New Haven: Yale University Press. . .
 Sargent, Roussel (1971). "Theme and Structure in Middleton's 'A Game At Chess'". The Modern Language Review. 66 (4). Retrieved 22 April 2019 – via JSTOR.
 Taylor, Gary (Spring 1994). "Forms of Opposition: Shakespeare and Middleton". English Literary Renaissance. 24. – via JSTOR.
 Taylor, Gary; Lavagnino, John, eds. (2007). Thomas Middleton and Early Modern Textual Culture: A Companion to the Collected Works. 2. Oxford: Oxford University Press. . .
 Wilson, Edward; Turner, Olga (1949). "The Spanish Protest Against "A Game at Chesse"". The Modern Language Review. 44- via JSTOR
 Wittek, Stephen (2015). "Middleton's A Game at Chess and the making of a theatrical public". Studies in English Literature. 55(2).

English Renaissance plays
1624 plays
Plays in manuscript
Chess in theatre
Satirical plays
Political satire plays
Plays based on real people
Plays set in the 17th century
Cultural depictions of Spanish kings
Cultural depictions of James VI and I
Cultural depictions of Ignatius of Loyola
Plays by Thomas Middleton